In Time with You is a 2011 Taiwanese television series written by Mag Hsu  and directed by Winnie Chu. It stars Ariel Lin and Chen Bolin.

Synopsis

Cheng You Qing (Ariel Lin) is the manager of a Taiwanese shoe manufacturer. On her 30th birthday, Cheng You Qing receives an email on "the symptoms of premature aging" from Li Da Ren (Chen Bolin), her best friend who she has known since high school. Unable to accept that he is like a bottle of fine wine that will get better with age and she is like a grape that will dry into a raisin as years go by, she agrees to a bet with Da Ren to see who will get married first before they turn 35. So they start to look for their potential lovers.

However, Da Ren often says the girls he date are not a match for him and at the same time, he is not satisfied with the boys You Qing dates. After Da Ren's relationship with his colleague, Maggie, he admits to Maggie that he has been in love with You Qing the whole time. But there is a coincidence that when You Qing is single, Da Ren has a girlfriend; while Da Ren break up with his girlfriend, You Qing has reconciled with her ex-boyfriend. So Da Ren is always missing the opportunity to tell You Qing his true feelings.

As Cheng You Qing looks around for a potential husband, she discovers that she was surrounded by unacceptable candidates. The only man who could love her despite her ill temper and stubbornness is her best friend. The only problem with this pairing is their extensive friendship.

Cast

Soundtrack

In Time with You Original Soundtrack (我可能不會愛你 電視原聲帶) was released on 19 October 2011, by various artists under Linfair Records. It contains ten songs, three of which are instrumental versions. The opening theme song is "Hai Shi Hui" or "Still Am" by William Wei, while the ending theme song is by Ariel Lin entitled "Chi Bang" or "Wings".

Track listing

Reception

Rival dramas on air at the same time:
 TTV Main Channel (TTV) (台視): Office Girls (小資女孩向前衝)
 CTV Main Channel (CTV) (中視): Love Recipe (料理情人夢)
 CTS Main Channel (CTS) (華視): They Are Flying (飛行少年) / Ring Ring Bell (真心請按兩次鈴)

International broadcasting
The drama was shown in other countries including China, Singapore, Hong Kong, Canada, the Philippines, United States, Malaysia and Korea. In Japan, the drama was broadcast on So-net from 12 September to 28 November 2012, on Wednesdays and Thursdays at 18:00 to 19:02. It was also shown on BS NTV from 27 February to 7 August 2013 on Wednesdays at 23:00 to 24:00. The drama was also broadcast on Japanese cable channel DATV with Japanese subtitles. In Singapore, it began on 28 September 2011 on Starhub's cable channel E City.

In Thailand, it was shown on Channel 7 beginning on 25 November 2014 at 02:00 to 03:00.

Remakes
A Korean drama remake titled The Time We Were Not in Love, starring Ha Ji-won and Lee Jin-wook, aired on SBS in June 2015.
Japanese remake titled  "I don't love you yet" aired on Fuji TV on July 15, 2019.

Thailand will be adapting the series in 2018, starring Mo Monchanok Saengchaipiangpen and Pae Arak Amornsupasiri.
Chinese Remake in 2018

Awards and nominations

References

External links
GTV In Time with You official web site 

2011 Taiwanese television series debuts
2011 Taiwanese television series endings
Taiwanese romance television series
Formosa Television original programming
Gala Television original programming
Television shows written by Mag Hsu
In Time with You